The 16th Louisiana Infantry Regiment was a unit of volunteers recruited in Louisiana that fought in the Confederate States Army during the American Civil War. The regiment organized in September 1861 and served during the war in the Western Theater of the American Civil War. The regiment fought at Shiloh, Corinth, and Perryville in 1862. In November 1862, the regiment was consolidated with the 25th Louisiana Infantry Regiment and served at Stones River, Jackson, Chickamauga, and Missionary Ridge in 1863. The unit fought at Resaca, New Hope Church, Atlanta, Ezra Church, Jonesborough, and Nashville in 1864. The consolidation with the 25th Louisiana was discontinued in February 1865 and the regiment was re-consolidated with the 1st Louisiana Regulars and 20th Louisiana Infantry Regiments. The unit fought its final battle at Spanish Fort. The regiment was again consolidated into the Chalmette Regiment shortly before surrendering in May 1865.

See also
List of Louisiana Confederate Civil War units
Louisiana in the Civil War

Notes

References

 

Units and formations of the Confederate States Army from Louisiana
1861 establishments in Louisiana
Military units and formations established in 1861
1865 disestablishments in Louisiana
Military units and formations disestablished in 1865